Donavon Hawk is an American politician and activist serving as a member of the Montana House of Representatives from the 76th district. Elected in November 2020, he assumed office on January 4, 2021.

Education 
Hawk spent two years studying fashion and apparel design at the Academy of Art University in San Francisco. He then earned certificates in surgical technology and occupational safety from Montana Technological University.

Career 
After working as a retail manager in Washington, D.C., Hawk returned to his hometown of Butte, Montana, where he became active in local politics and activism. He worked with the Silver Bow County Democratic Party and currently serves as the treasurer of the Montana Democratic Party. Since August 2018, he has worked as the marketing and public relations coordinator for the Butte Family YMCA. Hawk was elected to the Montana House of Representatives in November 2020 and assumed office on January 4, 2021.

During the 2021 session, Hawk served as a member of the House Judiciary, Education, Local Government, and Legislative Administration Committees.

Personal
Hawk is openly gay.

References 

Living people
Montana Technological University alumni
Democratic Party members of the Montana House of Representatives
People from Butte, Montana
21st-century American politicians
Native American state legislators in Montana
Gay politicians
LGBT state legislators in Montana
1981 births
21st-century LGBT people